Brothers Under the Skin is a 1922 American silent comedy film directed by E. Mason Hopper. This picture survives in the Turner archives but is incomplete.

Plot
As described in a review in a film publication, Newton Craddock (O'Malley), a shipping clerk who makes $30 per week, loves his wife Millie (Chadwick) even though she is running him into debt through her extravagance. Thomas Kirtland (Kerry) has the same problem with his wife Dorothy (Windsor) even though he makes $30,000 per year. After a fight with his wife, Newton decides to kill himself but is stopped by some wharf workers. Newton is given $5 to deliver a package to the Kirtlands' apartment and, after finding the door open, lets himself in. He sees some of Dorothy's expensive gowns hanging there and exchanges them for the cheap gowns that he had purchased as a peace offering to his wife. He also helps himself to some liquor and sits down, only to find that the Kirtlands have returned home. Dorothy is suspicious of her husband and during an exchange of strong words notes the gowns. Newton then comes forward to explain what happened. Thomas refuses to be submissive any longer and dictates the new policy of the household. Newton returns to his home with the same strategy and finds his wife eager to bend to his will. Happiness then reigns in both households.

Cast
 Pat O'Malley as Newton Craddock
 Helene Chadwick as Millie Craddock
 Mae Busch as Flo Bulger
 Norman Kerry as Thomas Kirtland
 Claire Windsor as Dorothy Kirtland
 William Haines as Bit Part (uncredited)

References

External links

Stills at clairewindsor.weebly.com

1922 films
Films directed by E. Mason Hopper
American silent feature films
American black-and-white films
Goldwyn Pictures films
Lost American films
Silent American comedy films
1922 comedy films
1922 lost films
Lost comedy films
1920s American films